Othol Hershel Martin (October 18, 1908 – January 11, 1979), also known as Abe Martin, was an American football player, coach, and college athletics administrator.  He served as the head coach at Texas Christian University (TCU) from 1953 to 1966, compiling a record of 74–64–7.  Martin was also the athletic director at Texas Christian from 1963 to 1975.

Early life
Born in Jacksboro, Texas, Martin attended Jacksboro High School and then Texas Christian University in Fort Worth, where he played football under head coach Francis Schmidt.  He was part of TCU's first-ever Southwest Conference championship team in 1929. Schmidt gave Martin his nickname after he related his style to that of a newspaper column of the day named "Abe Martin Says". He set conference records for blocking punts and recovering fumbles at TCU.

Coaching career
After graduating from TCU in 1932, Martin began his coaching career at El Paso High School in 1934, where he won two district championships. In 1936, he moved across the state to coach at Lufkin High School, where he compiled a record of 66–10, with four district championships. He left coaching in 1943, but returned in 1944 to coach at Paschal High School in Fort Worth.

In 1945, he returned to TCU to coach football, and in 1953 was finally elevated to the head coaching position upon the retirement of Dutch Meyer. From 1953 to 1966, he coached the Horned Frogs to a 74–64–7 record, during which they appeared in the Cotton Bowl Classic three times, as well as the Sun Bowl and Bluebonnet Bowl once each. He coached seven All-Americans at TCU, including Jim Swink and Bob Lilly.

After his 1961 team upset a previously-undefeated Texas, Longhorns coach Darrell Royal famously described the Frogs as "cockroaches". Martin's casual response was that he had "never received so much criticism for winning a game".

After a disappointing 2–8 season in 1966, he resigned as head football coach.  He remained the school's athletic director, a post he assumed in 1963 and held until 1975. In 1972, he was elected to the Texas Sports Hall of Fame in Waco.

Legacy
Abe Martin Stadium in Lufkin, Texas, is named for Martin.

Head coaching record

College

References

External links
 
 Martin, Othol Hershel [Abe (1908–1979)] at the Handbook of Texas

1908 births
1979 deaths
TCU Horned Frogs athletic directors
TCU Horned Frogs football coaches
TCU Horned Frogs football players
High school football coaches in Texas
People from Jacksboro, Texas